The Moldova national football team represents Moldova in international football and is controlled by the Moldovan Football Federation, the governing body for football in Moldova. Moldova's home ground is Zimbru Stadium in Chișinău and their head coach is Serghei Cleșcenco. Shortly before the break-up of the Soviet Union, they played their first match against Georgia on 2 July 1991.

Two of their three best results in the 1990s came during the qualifiers for UEFA Euro 1996, with wins over Georgia (1–0) in Tbilisi and Wales (3–2) in Chișinău. In 2007, Moldova obtained a very good result, defeating Hungary 3–0 in Chișinău in Euro 2008 qualifying. Their best recent result was a 5–2 win over Montenegro during 2014 FIFA World Cup qualifying. The team has never qualified for the final stages of the UEFA European Championship nor the FIFA World Cup as of present time.

Following Moldova's 4–0 defeat to England in September 1997, British writer and comedian Tony Hawks travelled to Moldova to challenge and beat all 11 Moldovan international footballers at tennis. The feature film version of the book of the same name, Playing the Moldovans at Tennis, was filmed in and around Chișinău in May and June 2010 and was released in the spring of 2012.

History
The Moldovan Football Federation was founded in 1990. However, the national football team of Moldova did not play an official international match until 1991, when Moldova lost to Georgia.

Moldova's first attempt to qualify for the FIFA World Cup was in 1998, but they failed to qualify for the tournament. Moldova has finished either last or second last in all tournament qualifying campaigns entered to date, except UEFA Euro 2008 qualifying, in which they finished fifth in the seven-team Group C with 12 points.

Current sponsorship
German sports company Jako has been Moldova's official kit manufacturer since 2000.

 Official sponsors: Bere Chișinău, Jako, Rusnac, Infront Sports & Media (Moldova), Bemol, iTicket (Moldova), Vizită, Orange (Moldova)

Results and fixtures

2022

2023

Coaching staff

Current coaching staff

Manager history
Former forward and all-time top goalscorer of Moldova is the current head coach of Moldova national team since December 2021.

Statistics correct as of match played on 25 September 2022

Players

Current squad
The following players were called up for the friendly matches against Azerbaijan and Romania on 16 and 20 November 2022.

Caps and goals updated as of 16 November 2022, after the match against Azerbaijan.

Recent call-ups
The following players have been called up for the team within the last 12 months.

INJ Withdrew due to injury
PRE Preliminary squad / standby
RET Retired from the national team
SUS Serving suspension
WD Player withdrew from the squad due to non-injury issue.

Player recordsPlayers in bold are still active with Moldova.Most appearances

Top goalscorers

Competitive record

FIFA World Cup

UEFA European Championship

UEFA Nations League

By competition

Head-to-head recordLast match updated was against  on 25 September 2022.''

References

External links

Federația Moldovenească de Fotbal 
RSSSF archive of results: 1991–present 
Reports for all matches of Moldova national team 

 
Football in Moldova
European national association football teams